Camp Seminole may be:
Camp Seminole (Mississippi)
Camp Seminole (Florida)